Galați is a railway station located in Galați, Galați County, Romania. The station is located on the Galați – Bucharest, Galați – Giurgiulești, Galați – Bârlad, and Galați – Tecuci lines.

In June 2014, CFR announced that it would accept tenders of RON 20 million for station rebuilding and reconstruction work at Galați.

References

Railway stations in Romania
Buildings and structures in Galați